The biological systematics and  taxonomy of invertebrates as proposed by Richard C. Brusca and Gary J. Brusca in 2003 is a system of classification of invertebrates, as a way to classify animals without backbones.

Prokaryotes

Kingdom 
Kingdom

Eukaryotes (Eukaryota, or Eukarya)

Kingdom 
Kingdom  (= Metaphyta)
Kingdom 
Phylum 
Phylum 

Phylum 
Phylum 
Phylum 
Phylum 
Phylum 
Phylum 
Phylum 
Phylum 
Phylum 
Phylum 
Phylum 
Phylum 
Phylum 
Phylum 
Phylum 
Incertae sedis: Genus

Kingdom Animalia (Metazoa)

Parazoa

Phylum Porifera
Phylum Porifera
Class Calcarea
Subclass Calcinea
Subclass Calcaronea
Class Hexactinellida
Subclass Amphidiscophora
Subclass Hexasterophora
Class Demospongiae
Subclass Homoscleromorpha
Subclass Tetractinomorpha
Subclass Ceractinomorpha

Mesozoa

Phylum Placozoa
Phylum Placozoa
Trichoplax adhaerens

Phylum Monoblastozoa
Phylum Monoblastozoa
Salinella

Phylum Rhombozoa
Phylum Rhombozoa
Order Dicyemida
Order Heterocyemida

Phylum Orthonectida
Phylum Orthonectida

Eumetazoa

Radiata

Phylum Cnidaria
Phylum Cnidaria
Class Hydrozoa
Order Hydroida
Suborder Anthomedusae (= Gymnoblastea or Athecata)
Suborder Leptomedusae (= Calyptoblastea or Thecata)
Order Trachylina
Order Siphonophora
Order Chondrophora
Order Actinulida
Class Anthozoa
Subclass Octocorallia (= Alcyonaria)
Order Alcyonacea
Order Gastraxonacea
Order Gorgonacea
Order Helioporacea
Order Pennatulacea
Order Protoalcyonaria
Order Stolonifera
Order Telestacea
Subclass Hexacorallia (= Zoantharia)
Order Actiniaria
Order Scleractinia (= Madreporaria)
Order Zoanthidea
Order Corallimorpharia
Subclass Ceriantipatharia
Order Antipatharia
Order Ceriantharia
Class Cubozoa
Class Scyphozoa
Order Stauromedusae
Order Coronatae
Order Semaeostomae
Order Rhizostomae

Phylum Ctenophora
Phylum Ctenophora
Order Beroida
Order Cestida
Order Cydippida
Order Ganeshida
Order Lobata
Order Platyctenida
Order Thalassocalycida

Bilateria

The authors divide the bilaterians in three informal groups: 
 acoelomates (phyla Platyhelminthes, Gastrotricha, Entoprocta, Gnathostomulida, Cycliophora)
 blastocoelomate (or pseducoelomate, phyla Rotifera, Kinorhyncha, Nematoda, Nematomorpha, Acanthocephala, Loricifera) 
 coelomates (or eucoelomates, phyla Nemertea, Priapula, Annelida, Sipuncula, Echiura, Onychophora, Tardigrada, Arthropoda, Mollusca, Phoronida, Ectoprocta, Brachiopoda, Echinodermata, Chaetognatha, Hemichordata, Chordata).

Several groups traditionally viewed as having a blastocoelomate condition are viewed here as acoelomates (e.g., Gastrotricha, Entoprocta, Gnathostomulida).

Some of the coelomates groups (e.g., Arthropoda, Mollusca) have greatly reduced celomic spaces; often the main body cavity is a bloodfilled space called a hemocoel, and is associated with an open circulatory system.

The Brachiopoda, Ectoprocta and Phoronida are viewed as lophophorates.

In a phylogeny, the bilaterians are divided in:
 Protostomia
 Cycloneuralia
 Loricifera
 Kinorhyncha
 Priapula
 Nematomorpha
 Nemata
 Gastrotricha
 Acanthocephala
 Rotifera
 Cycliophora
 Entoprocta
 Gnathostomulida
 Articulata
 Arthropoda
 Tardigrada
 Onychophora
 Annelida
 Echiura
 Mollusca
 Sipuncula
 Nemertea
 Platyhelminthes
 Deuterostomia
 Chordata
 Vertebrata
 Cephalochordata
 Urochordata
 Hemichordata
 Pterobranchia
 Enteropneusta
 Echinodermata
 Chaetognatha
 Brachiopoda
 Ectoprocta
 Phoronida

Phylum Platyhelminthes
Phylum Platyhelminthes
Class Turbellaria
Order Acoela
Order Catenulida
Order Haplopharyngida
Order Lecithoepitheliata
Order Macrostomida
Order Nemertodermatida
Order Polycladida
Order Prolecithophora
Order Proplicastomata
Order Proseriata
Order Rhabdocoela
Suborder Dalyellioida
Suborder Thyphloplanoida
Suborder Kalyptorhynchia
Suborder Temnocephalida
Order Tricladida
Class Monogenea
Subclass Monopisthocotylea
Subclass Polyopisthocotylea
Class Trematoda
Subclass Digenea
Subclass Aspidogastrea
Class Cestoda
Subclass Cestodaria
Subclass Eucestoda

Phylum Nemertea
Phylum Nemertea
Class Anopla
Class Enopla

Phylum Rotifera
Phylum Rotifera
Class Digonata
Order Seisonidea
Order Bdelloidea
Class Monogononta

Phylum Gastrotricha
Phylum Gastrotricha
Order Macrodasyida
Order Chaetonotida
Suborder Multitubulatina
Suborder Paucitubulatina

Phylum Kinorhyncha
Phylum Kinorhyncha
Order Cyclorhagida
Order Homalorhagida

Phylum Nematoda (= Nemata)
Phylum Nematoda (= Nemata)
Class Adenophorea (= Aphasmida)
Subclass Enoplia
Subclass Chromadoria
Class Secernentea (= Phasmida)
Subclass Rhabditia
Subclass Spiruria
Subclass Diplogasteria

Phylum Nematomorpha
Phylum Nematomorpha
Order Nectonematoidea
Order Gordioidea

Phylum Priapula
Phylum Priapula
Family Priapulidae
Family Tubiluchidae
Family Maccabeidae (= Chaetostephanidae)

Phylum Acanthocephala
Phylum Acanthocephala
Class Palaeacanthocephala
Class Archiacanthocephala
Class Eoacanthocephala

Phylum Entoprocta (= Kamptozoa)
Phylum Entoprocta (= Kamptozoa)
Family Loxosomatidae
Family Loxokalypodidae
Family Pedicellinidae
Family Barentsiidae

Phylum Gnathostomulida
Phylum Gnathostomulida
Order Filospermoidea
Order Bursovaginoidea

Phylum Loricifera
Phylum Loricifera
Order Nanaloricida
Family Nanaloricidae
Family Pliciloricidae

Phylum Cycliophora
Phylum Cycliophora
Symbion pandora

Phylum Annelida
Phylum Annelida
Class Polychaeta, with 25 orders and 87 families (not all are listed)
Order Capitellida
Order Chaetopterida
Order Cirratulida
Order Eunicida
Order Myzostomida
Order Opheliida
Order Spionida
Order Orbiniida
Order Oweniida
Order Phyllodocida
Order Sabellida
Order Terebellida
Class Clitellata
Subclass Oligochaeta
Order Lumbriculida
Family Lumbriculidae
Order Moniligastrida
Family Moniligastridae
 Order Haplotaxida, with 25 families (not all are listed)
Family Almidae
Family Megascolecidae
Family Tubificidae
Family Naididae
Family Lumbricidae
Subclass Hirudinoidea
Order Acanthobdellida
Order Branchiobdellida
Order Hirudinida

Phylum Sipuncula
Phylum Sipuncula
Class Phascolosomida
Order Aspidosiphoniformes
Order Phascolosomiformes
Class Sipunculida
Order Golfingiaformes
Family Themistidae
Family Phascolionidae
Family Golfingiidae
Order Sipunculiformes

Phylum Echiura
Phylum Echiura
Order Echiuroinea
Order Xenopneusta
Order Heteromyota

Phylum Onychophora
Phylum Onychophora
Family Peripatidae
Family Peripatopsidae

Phylum Tardigrada
Phylum Tardigrada
Order Heterotardigrada
Order Mesotardigrada
Order Eutardigrada

Phylum Arthropoda
Phylum Arthropoda
 Subphylum Trilobitomorpha
 Subphylum Crustacea
 Class Remipedia
 Class Cephalocarida
 Class Branchiopoda
 Order Anostraca
 Order Notostraca
 Order Diplostraca
 Suborder Laevicaudata
 Suborder Spinicaudata
 Suborder Cyclestherida
 Suborder Cladocera
 Class Malacostraca
 Subclass Phyllocarida
 Order Lepstostraca
 Subclass Eumalacostraca
 Superorder Hoplocarida
 Order Stomatopoda
 Superorder Syncarida
 Order Bathynellacea
 Order Anaspidacea
 Superorder Eucarida
 Order Euphausiacea
 Order Amphionidacea
 Order Decapoda
 Suborder Dendrobranchiata
 Suborder Pleocyemata
 Infraorder Caridea
 Infraorder Stenopodidea
 Infraorder Brachyura
 Infraorder Anomura
 Infraorder Astacidea
 Infraorder Palinura
 Infraorder Thalassinidea
 Superorder Peracarida
 Order Mysida
 Order Lophogastrida
 Order Cumacea
 Order Tanaidacea
 Order Mictacea
 Order Spelaeogriphacea
 Order Thermosbaenacea
 Order Isopoda
 Suborder Anthuridea
 Suborder Asellota
 Suborder Calabozoidea
 Suborder Epicaridea
 Suborder Flabellifera
 Suborder Gnathiidea
 Suborder Oniscidea
 Suborder Phreatoicidea
 Suborder Valvifera
 Order Amphipoda
 Suborder Gammaridea
 Suborder Hyperiidea
 Suborder Caprellidea
 Suborder Ingolfiellidea
Class Maxillopoda
 Subclass Thecostraca
 Infraclass Facetotecta
 Infraclass Ascothoracida
 Infraclass Cirripedia
 Superorder Acrothoracica
 Superorder Rhizocephala
 Superorder Thoracica
 Subclass Tantulocarida
 Subclass Branchiura
 Subclass Pentastomida
 Subclass Mystacocarida
 Subclass Copepoda
 Infraclass Progymnoplea
 Order Platycopioida
 Infraclass Neocopepoda
 Order Calanoida
 Order Cyclopoida
 Order Gelyelloida
 Order Harpacticoida
 Order Misophrioida
 Order Monstrilloida
 Order Mormonilloida
 Order Poecilostomatoida
 Order Siphonostomatoida
 Subclass Ostracoda
 Superorder Myodocopa
 Order Myodocopida
 Order Halocyprida
 Superorder Podocopa
 Order Podocopida
 Order Platycopida
 Order Palaeocopida
Subphylum Hexapoda
Class Entognatha
 Order Collembola
 Order Protura
 Order Diplura
Class Insecta
 Subclass Archaeognatha
 Order Archaeognatha (= Microcoryphia)
 Subclass Zygentoma
 Order Thysanura
 Subclass Pterygota
 Infraclass Palaeoptera
 Order Ephemeroptera
 Order Odonata
 Infraclass Neoptera
 Order Plecoptera
 Order Blattodea
 Order Isoptera
 Order Mantodea
 Order Phasmida (= Phasmatoptera)
 Order Grylloblattodea
 Order Dermaptera
 Order Orthoptera
 Order Mantophasmatodea
 Order Embioptera
 Order Zoraptera
 Order Psocoptera
 Order Phthiraptera
 Order Thysanoptera
 Order Hemiptera
 Order Strepsiptera
 Order Megaloptera
 Order Raphidioptera
 Order Neuroptera
 Order Coleoptera
 Order Mecoptera
 Order Siphonaptera
 Order Diptera
 Order Trichoptera
 Order Lepidoptera
 Order Hymenoptera
Subphylum Myriapoda
Class Diplopoda
 Subclass Penicillata
 Order Polyxenida
 Subclass Chilognatha
 Order Callipodida
 Order Chordeumatida
 Order Glomerida
 Order Glomeridesmida
 Order Julida
 Order Platydesmida
 Order Polydesmida
 Order Polyzoniida
 Order Siphonophorida
 Order Siphoniulida
 Order Sphaerotheriida
 Order Spirobolida
 Order Spirostreptida
 Order Stemmiulida
Class Chilopoda
 Subclass Notostigmophora
 Order Scutigeromorpha
 Subclass Pleurostigmophora
 Order Craterostigmomorpha
 Order Geophilomorpha
 Order Lithobiomorpha
 Order Scolopendromorpha
Class Pauropoda
Class Symphyla
Subphylum Cheliceriformes
Class Pycnogonida
Class Chelicerata
 Subclass Merostomata
 Order Eurypterida
 Order Xiphosura
 Subclass Arachnida
 Order Acari
 Suborder Opiloacarifomes
 Suborder Parasitiformes
 Suborder Acariformes
 Order Amblypygi
 Order Araneae
 Suborder Mesothelae
 Suborder Opisthothelae
 Superfamily Mygalomorpha
 Family Ctenizidae
 Family Atypidae
 Family Theraphosidae
 Family Dipluridae
 Superfamily Araneomorphae
 Family Loxoscelidae
 Family Theridiidae
 Family Uloboridae
 Family Araneidae
 Family Tetragnathidae
 Family Clubionidae
 Family Linyphiidae
 Family Agelenidae
 Family Argyronetidae
 Family Lycosidae
 Family Pisauridae
 Family Oxyopidae
 Family Thomisidae
 Family Heteropodidae
 Family Salticidae
 Family Dinopidae
 Family Scytodidae
 Order Opiliones
 Order Palpigradi
 Order Pseudoscorpionida
 Order Ricinulei
 Order Schizomida
 Order Scorpiones
 Order Solpugida
 Order Uropygi

Phylum Mollusca
 Phylum Mollusca
 Class Aplacophora
 Subclass Chaetodermomorpha (= Caudofoveata)
 Subclass Neomeniomorpha (= Solenogastres)
 Class Monoplacophora
 Class Polyplacophora
 Order Lepidopleurida
 Order Ischnochitonida
 Order Acanthochitonida
 Class Gastropoda
 Subclass Prosobranchia
 Order Archaeogastropoda
 Order Mesogastropoda
 Order Neogastropoda
 Subclass Opisthobranchia
 Order Acochlidioidea
 Order Cephalaspidea
 Order Runcinoidea
 Order Sacoglossa
 Order Anaspidea
 Order Thecosomata
 Order Gymnosomata
 Order Notaspidea
 Order Nudibranchia
 Subclass Pulmonata
 Order Archaeopulmonata
 Order Basommatophora
 Order Stylommatophora
 Order Systellommatophora
 Class Bivalvia (=Pelecypoda, or Lamellibranchiata)
 Subclass Protobranchia
 Order Nuculida (= Palaeotaxodonta)
 Order Solemyida (= Cryptodonta)
 Subclass Lamellibranchia
 Superorder Filibranchia (= Pteriomorpha)
 Superorder Eulamellibranchia (= Heterodonta)
 Order Palaeoheterodonta
 Order Veneroida
 Order Myoida
 Subclass Anomalodesmata
 Class Scaphopoda
 Class Cephalopoda (= Siphonopoda)
 Subclass Nautiloidea (= Tetrabranchiata)
 Subclass Coleoidea (= Dibranchiata)
 Order Sepioida
 Order Teuthoida (= Decapoda)
 Order Octopoda
 Order Vampyromorpha

Phylum Phoronida
Phylum Phoronida

Phylum Ectoprocta (= Bryozoa)
Phylum Ectoprocta (= Bryozoa)
Class Phylactolaemata
Class Stenolaemata
Class Gymnolaemata
Order Ctenostomata
Order Cheilostomata

Phylum Brachiopoda
Phylum Brachiopoda
Class Inarticulata
Class Articulata

Phylum Echinodermata
Phylum Echinodermata
Class Crinoidea
Class Asteroidea
Order Platysterida
Order Paxillosida
Order Valvatida
Order Spinulosida
Order Forcipulatida
”Sea daisies” (previously the class Concentricycloidea, but assigned by many authorities to the Spinulosida)
Class Ophiuroidea
Order Oegophiurida
Order  Phrynophiurida
Order Ophiurida
Class Echinoidea
Subclass Cidaroidea
Subclass Euechinoidea
Infraclass Echinothurioidea
Infraclass Acroechinoidea
Cohort Diadematacea
Cohort Echinacea
Cohort Irregularia
Class Holothuroidea 
Subclass Dendrochirotacea
Order Dactylochirotida
Order Dendrochirotida
Subclass Aspidochirotacea
Order Aspidochirotida
Order Elasipodida
Subclass Apodacea
Order Molpadida
Order Apodida

Phylum Chaetognatha
Phylum Chaetognatha
Order Phragmophora
Order Aphragmophora

Phylum Hemichordata
Phylum Hemichordata
Class Enteropneusta
Class Pterobranchia
Class Planctosphaeroidea

Phylum Chordata
Phylum Chordata
Subphylum Urochordata (= Tunicata)
Class Ascidiacea
Class Thaliacea
Class Appendicularia (= Larvacea)
Class Sorberacea
Subphylum Cephalochordata (= Acrania)
Subphylum Vertebrata
Class Myxini
Class Cephalaspidomorphi
Class Chondrichthyes
Class Osteichthyes
Class Amphibia
Class Reptiliomorpha (= Sauropsida)
Class Mammalia

See also

References 

Systems of animal taxonomy
taxonomy